Jasus is a genus of spiny lobsters which live in the oceans of the Southern Hemisphere. They have two distinct "horns" projecting from the front of the carapace, but lack the stridulating organs present in almost all other genera of spiny lobsters. Like all spiny lobsters, they lack claws, and have long stout antennae which are quite flexible.

The generic name Jasus is derived from the Ancient Greek town of Iasos (on the Mediterranean Sea, located in modern Turkey), which was famous for its prawns and stamped them on some of its coins.

Species
The following species are included in the genus Jasus:

Another species, formerly known as "Jasus verreauxi" is found around New Zealand (especially the North Island), the Chatham Islands, and around Australia (Queensland to Victoria and Tasmania); it is now placed in the genus Sagmariasus.

Fossils
Jasus jlemingi Glaessner, 1960 - a Miocene fossil from New Zealand

Fisheries
Most of the extant species are liable to commercial exploitation, with the majority of the A$4.6 million New South Wales lobster fishery industry being based on J. edwardsii and the closely related Sagmariasus verreauxi. Jasus lalandii is the most important commercial rock lobster in southern Africa.

References

External links

Achelata
Edible crustaceans
Commercial crustaceans
Decapod genera
Extant Miocene first appearances